Staphylininae are a subfamily of rove beetles (family Staphylinidae). They contain the typical rove beetles with their long but fairly robust blunt-headed and -tipped bodies and short elytra, as well as some more unusually-shaped lineages.

Systematics

As it seems, the Staphylininae are part of a large clade together with the subfamilies Euaesthetinae, Leptotyphlinae, Megalopsidiinae, Oxyporinae, Paederinae, Pseudopsinae, Scydmaeninae, Solieriinae, Steninae, and the extinct Protactinae which are only known from fossils.

The numerous Staphylininae genera are divided into six tribes, listed below along with some notable genera. However, a scientific study in 2020 proposed moving all tribes except Staphylinini to other subfamilies and raising several of Staphylinini's subtribes to tribal level. This would result in a new total of twelve tribes: Acylophorini, Afroquediini, Amblyopinini, Antimerini, †Baltognathini, Cyrtoquediini, Erichsoniini, Hyptiomini, Indoquediini, Quediini, Staphylinini and Tanygnathinini.

 Diochini Casey, 1906
 Antarctothius Coiffait & Saiz
 Coomania Cameron
 Diochus Erichson, 1839
 Diochus electrus Chatzimanolis & Engel, 2011 (Lutetian, Baltic amber)
 Maorothiini
 Othiini C.G.Thomson, 1859
 Platyprosopini Lynch, 1884
 Staphylinini Latreille, 1802 (including Philonthini, Tanygnathinini)
 Cafius
 Creophilus
 Creophilus maxillosus – hairy rove beetle
 Eucibdelus
 Gabrius
 Jurecekia
 Ocypus
 Ocypus olens – devil's coach-horse beetle
 Ocypus ophthalmicus
 Ontholestes
 Paederomimus
 Philonthus
 Philonthus cognatus
 Quedius
 Quedius curtipennis
 Quedius fuliginosus
 Rhynchocheilus
 Staphylinus
 Stevensia
 Thinopinus – pictured rove beetle
 Velleius
 Velleius dilatatus
 Xantholinini Erichson, 1839
 Leptacinus
 Leptacinus intermedius
 Xantholinus

References

External links